Macrocybe lobayensis is a species of mushroom that is native to west Africa.

References

External links

Macrocybe lobayensis  Fungaioli Siciliani

Tricholomataceae
Fungi of Africa